Scarsick is the sixth studio album by Swedish progressive metal band Pain of Salvation, released on 22 January 2007.  It is a concept album focusing on contemporary issues including capitalism, materialism, and consumerism.  Scarsick is the last album to feature Johan Langell on drums.

Overview
According to Daniel Gildenlöw, "Scarsick is much more band oriented and down to the core. Threatening and disturbing".

The liner notes reveal that Scarsick is actually The Perfect Element, part II - "he". The album is divided into two chapters: side A and side B.

Concept
Scarsick is the second part of a planned, three-piece concept and the follow-up to The Perfect Element, part I.  It continues the story of the male character from the latter album.  Unlike its predecessor, Scarsick is a politically charged social commentary, and deals with a number of topics, including:

Frustration (with society in general, and most of the things listed below)
Consumer culture
Materialism
Industrialization
Capitalism
Commercialization
American imperialism
Conformity
Idolization of celebrities
Collectivist nature of religion
Decline of civilization

Daniel Gildenlow has revealed in interviews that the life of "He" is an allegory for all of mankind; that in him we see the problems of society on an intimate, personal level.  Thus as The Perfect Element, part I deals with the subject of dysfunction in a psychological context that deals with the individual, Scarsick deals with them in a sociological sense and explores the relationship between the two.  Just as the final song on the first part of the concept ("The Perfect Element") witnesses the falling of "He" on a mental level, the final song on Scarsick ("Enter Rain") sees him fall on a physical level.

Track listing 
Concept, music and lyrics by Daniel Gildenlöw.

Scarsicker
The band offered an edited version of the album as a download from their official store in 2008. It also featured two new short tracks. Gildenlöw said on the release,
I had this idea about making edits where all of the songs would clock in under 5 minutes each. My absolute first idea was to make a radio edit version of the album, where every song would simply be cut at precisely 3:50 or something, except for the track America, in which we instead would add like 10 minutes of commercials after the "We'll be back after this short break!" phrase. But once I was sitting down with the tracks it became sort of a challenge. Some of the songs I prefer in the original version, but some (like Idiocracy and Mrs Modern Mother Mary for instance) really turned out more like I initially intended them to be, and I prefer them. Also, I could use my original idea for an intro to the album - it was scrapped for the official release since I felt it gave away the TPE1 link way too soon. The Slipsync track uses recurring themes, a trademark POS conceptual instrumental passage, and was originally thought as a Japanese bonus track, but then it felt more right on this edited album version, called SCARSICKER.

Personnel
Daniel Gildenlöw - lead vocals, guitars, bass guitar, banjos and samplers
Johan Hallgren - guitars, vocals
Fredrik Hermansson - keyboards, samplers
Johan Langell - drums, backing vocals

References

External links
Official Pain of Salvation Website
Official Scarsick Website at InsideOut
Official Pain of Salvation Forum
"America" at InsideOut Music

Pain of Salvation albums
2007 albums
Concept albums
Inside Out Music albums
Nu metal albums by Swedish artists